"That Feeling, You Can Only Say What It Is in French” is a horror short story by American writer Stephen King. It was originally published in the June 22, 1998 issue of The New Yorker magazine. In 2002, it was collected in King's collection Everything's Eventual. It focuses on a married woman in a car ride on vacation constantly repeating the same events over and over, each event ending with the same gruesome outcome. In his closing remarks, King suggested that Hell is not "other people," as Sartre claimed, but repetition, enduring the same pain over and over again without end.

Plot summary
As the story progresses, a woman (Carol) begins to have déjà vu of the same car ride on their second honeymoon with the same bloody outcome every time. It never ends. It is implied, but never said, that they have crashed on the plane to their honeymoon location and they may be in Hell or Purgatory.

See also
 Stephen King short fiction bibliography

External links 

1998 short stories
Horror short stories
Short stories by Stephen King
Works originally published in The New Yorker